Hypertime is a fictional concept in DC Comics which first appeared in the 1999 The Kingdom limited series. It is a variation of the Multiverse concept that existed in DC Comics before 1985's Crisis on Infinite Earths limited series and was created by Mark Waid and Grant Morrison.

Hypertime, described in The Kingdom #2 as "the vast interconnected web of parallel time-lines which comprise all reality", was an attempt by Waid to resolve the various tangled continuity issues that were supposed to have been solved by Crisis on Infinite Earths. Keith Dallas and Jason Sacks wrote: "Through Hypertime, Waid sought to resolve the contradictions in DC's continuity once and for all. Indeed, Hypertime allows for contradictions because anything that didn't make sense can be attributed to overlapping timelines".

Concept

The Kingdom
Hypertime is a network of alternate timelines that branch off from the DC Universe. These timelines sometimes overlap with each other, causing alterations in reality. Characters can cross from one timeline to another if needed. It has been analogized to a river network that branches out and then runs 'up stream' to feed back into itself before splitting off again.

Hypertime has been used as a device to explain continuity errors. Some fans welcomed the idea as an explanation for earlier continuity errors while others criticized it for being a license to create more narrative problems.

The Hypertime concept was first introduced in The Kingdom, Mark Waid's sequel to Kingdom Come, and exists within the larger multiverse used within DC Comics publications.

Writer Mark Waid stated that "the possibilities are endless. Hypertime is an unashamed reaction to nearly 15 years of comics being made 'more realistic', less 'larger than life'. As far as we’re concerned, DC Comics shouldn't be about rules and regulations and ‘can’t happen’s and ‘shouldn’t be’s; they should be about anything and everything that tells a good story and gets fans excited".

Infinite Crisis

When Superboy-Prime fractures reality from the pocket universe he is residing in, images of the world of Kingdom Come including Gog from The Kingdom limited series appears while doing so, showing that Superboy-Prime's actions created Hypertime.

52
Mister Mind, disguised as Skeets, refers to Waverider as "the seer of Hypertime".

Booster Gold
An older Booster Gold, while explaining his duties to his son Rip Hunter, mentions the concept of Hypertime.

Multiversity
Hypertime is used to explain the formation and alteration of the 52 universes formed at the end of 52.

Rebirth
Hypertime has been mentioned several times in the Prime Earth continuity.

Flashpoint Beyond
Hypertime is presented as one of two halves of “the Divine Continuum”, the other half being the Omniverse. The Omniverse represents Space, while Hypertime represents Time. Where the Omniverse is characterized as being fundamentally conceptual in nature, Hypertime is characterized as being emotional, with branches happening whenever decisions of great importance take place. Previous Crises are reclassified as being either Omniverse Crises (the Crisis on Infinite Earth, Infinite Crisis, Final Crisis, Multiversity, Dark Nights, and Dark Crisis) or Hypertime Crises (Zero Hour, The Kingdom, Flashpoint, Convergence, and Doomsday Clock).

See also
 Multiverse (Marvel Comics)

References

Further reading

External links
Unofficial Hypertime Website 

Time and Hypertime

1999 in comics
Continuity (fiction)
DC Comics dimensions
Fictional elements introduced in 1999
Multiple time paths in fiction
Physics in fiction